Salaam Gariba (born 23 January 1969 in Tamale) is a retired Ghanaian sprinter who specialized in the 100 metres.

He won the silver medal at the 1989 African Championships. He reached the semi-final at the 1991 World Championships and in relay at the 1987 World Championships. He also competed at the 1993 World Championships and the 1988 Olympic Games.

His personal best time was 10.27 seconds, achieved in April 1991 in Philadelphia.

References

External links

1969 births
Living people
Ghanaian male sprinters
Athletes (track and field) at the 1988 Summer Olympics
Athletes (track and field) at the 1994 Commonwealth Games
Olympic athletes of Ghana
Commonwealth Games competitors for Ghana
World Athletics Championships athletes for Ghana
People from Tamale, Ghana
20th-century Ghanaian people
21st-century Ghanaian people